Adrià Collado (born 3 August 1972) is a Spanish actor. He appeared in more than fifty films since 1994.

Selected filmography

Films
 1999: Why Not Me?
 2000:  The Art of Dying as Carlos
 2002: Bloody Mallory
 2006: Kilometer 31
 2006: To Let
 2008: Proyecto Dos
2021: Donde caben dos (More the Merrier) as Sergio

TV series
 2003-2006: Aquí no hay quien viva as Fernando Navarro

References

External links 

1972 births
Living people
Spanish male film actors
20th-century Spanish male actors
21st-century Spanish male actors